The Great Gundown (also known as Savage Red, Outlaw White) is a 1977 American Western film directed by Paul Hunt and written by Steve Fisher. The film stars Robert Padilla, Malila Saint Duval, Richard Rust, Steve Oliver, David Eastman, Stanley Adams and Rockne Tarkington. The film was released on August 4, 1977, by AVCO Embassy Pictures.

Plot

Cast       
 Robert Padilla as Mario Ochoa / The Savage
 Malila Saint Duval as Teresa
 Richard Rust as Joe Riles
 Steve Oliver as Arden
 David Eastman as Edgely
 Stanley Adams as Buck
 Rockne Tarkington as Sutton
 Michael Christian as Darwood
 Michael Greene as Preacher Gage
 Owen Orr as "Happy" Hogan
 Paul Hunt as Jim, The Gunsel
 Ted Markland as Herien
 Haydee Dubarry as Tia Maria
 Lucas Andreas as Deputy
 Gene Borkan as Brink
 Stephen Whittaker as Laredo
 John Bellah as Billy "Bullit"
 Darrell Cotton as Darrell
 A.J. Solari as A.J.
 Frank Packard as Jack
 Miki St. Clair as Miki
 John Jarrell as Townsman
 Joe A. Padilla as Jess
 Brian Padilla as The Boy
 James Trujillo as Ramon
 Wesley Speake as The Bartender
 Tom Garcia as Old Indian
 Cecilia Speake as Teresa's Mother
 Don Megowan as "Baldy"
 John Chilton as Higgins
 Don McGovern as Calhoun
 Patrick Hawley as Morley
 Doodles Weaver as Baggage Man
 Noble "Kid" Chissell as The Train Engineer
 Virgil Frye as John Bayers

References

External links
 

1977 films
American Western (genre) films
1977 Western (genre) films
Embassy Pictures films
1970s English-language films
1970s American films